The Polillo Islands is a group of about 27 islands in the Philippine Sea lying about  to the east of the Philippine island of Luzon. It is separated from Luzon Island by the Polillo Strait and forms the northern side of Lamon Bay. The islands are part of the province of Quezon in the Calabarzon region of the Philippines. The combined land area of all the islands is about 875 square kilometers making Polillo islands even larger than the island city-state of Singapore.

Major islands

The three major islands are:

Polillo Island 
Patnanungan Island 
Jomalig Island 

These islands comprise the towns of Polillo, Patnanungan, Jomalig, Panukulan and Burdeos.

The biggest Polillo Island is divided into three municipalities of Polillo, Burdeos, and Panukulan. 

Burdeos Bay lies in between the islands of Patnanungan and Polillo

Polillo also includes the privately-owned resort island of Balesin, located further south in the middle of Lamon Bay.

Polillo (southern part of Polillo Island, including Balesin Island)
Burdeos (northeastern part of Polillo Island, including smaller islands like Palasan, Kalotkot, and Kalongkooan)
Panukulan (northwestern part of Polillo Island)
Patnanungan (middle island)
Jomalig (easternmost island)

Gallery

References

External links

Islands of Quezon
Archipelagoes of the Philippines
Archipelagoes of the Pacific Ocean
Archipelagoes of Southeast Asia
Maritime Southeast Asia